The Richmond Declaration was made by 95 Quakers (representatives of all Orthodox Gurneyite Friends Yearly Meetings) in September 1887, at a conference in Richmond, Indiana. It was a declaration of faith, and although Quakers do not have a dogma or creed, the Richmond Declaration has been used as a standard by certain groups of Quakers, mainly Orthodox (now represented by Friends United Meeting) and Evangelical (represented by Evangelical Friends International), ever since. The Declaration was "approved," "accepted," or "adopted" by the Orthodox Yearly Meetings of Indiana, Western, New England, New York, Baltimore, North Carolina, Iowa, and Canada.  Among Orthodox Gurneyite Friends in North America, only Ohio and Philadelphia yearly meetings did not so act.  The Friends United Meeting General Board reaffirmed the declaration as a statement of faith in February 2007. The Declaration appears in most books of discipline of Evangelical and Friends United Meeting yearly meetings.

Criticism of the Declaration

The declaration states, among other things, that the inner light will never guide people in a direction that contradicts the Bible. This emphasis is something that many yearly meetings do not share - especially Liberal Quakers, such as those associated with Friends General Conference. Orthodox Quakers, however, value this teaching as a check on human enthusiasm and error masquerading as leadings of the Spirit.

"It has ever been, and still is, the belief of the Society of Friends that the Holy Scriptures of the Old and New Testament were given by inspiration of God; that, therefore, there can be no appeal from them to any other authority whatsoever; that they are able to make wise unto salvation, through faith which is in Jesus Christ. ... [W]hatsoever anyone says or does, contrary to the Scriptures, though under profession of the immediate guidance of the Holy Spirit, must be reckoned and accounted a mere delusion. "

Critics of the Declaration, such as Chuck Fager, have pointed out that the Richmond Declaration has never represented the majority of Friends and is a mere remnant of a historical schism. Among other criticisms, Fager argues that the statement quoted above is factually inaccurate, as it directly contradicts statements from Robert Barclay's Apology for the True Christian Divinity (commonly known as Barclay's Apology), which predates the Declaration by over two centuries.

Though it was primarily written by a British Friend, Joseph Bevan Braithwaite, Britain Yearly Meeting (then called London Yearly Meeting) rejected the proposal that it be adopted. The Richmond Declaration was one factor leading to a sharp doctrinal turn for London Yearly Meeting in 1895.

The Declaration is not accepted as a statement of faith by Friends General Conference or Beanite Quakerism in North America, or by most "unprogrammed" Quaker meetings.
The vast majority of Quakers are in Friends United Meeting and Evangelical Friends International who use the Richmond Declaration as a statement of faith.

References

External links
Richmond Declaration according to Quakerinfo.com

Quakerism
Richmond, Indiana
1887 documents
1887 in Christianity